The Chief Justice of Bermuda is the senior judge of the Supreme Court of Bermuda.

Chief Justices
2018–present Narinder Hargun
2012–2018 Ian Kawaley
2004–2012 Richard Ground
1993-2004 Sir Austin Ward 
1977-1993 Sir James Rufus Astwood 
1973–1977 Sir John Crampton Summerfield (later Chief Justice of the Cayman Islands, 1978)
1968–1973 Sir George Oswald Ratteray
1961–1968 Sir Myles John Abbott
1960–1961 Sir Allen C. Smith (acting)
1958–1960 Sir Newnham Arthur Worley
1952–1958 Joseph Trounsell Gilbert
1941–1952 Sir Cyril Gerard Brooke Francis 
1939–1941 R. C. Hollis Hallett (acting)
1927–1939 Sydney Orme Rowan-Hamilton
1924–1927 Sir Kenneth James Beatty
1917–1923 Sir Colin Rees-Davies
1912–1917 Percy Musgrave Cresswell Sheriff
1904–1911 Sir Henry Cowper Gollan (afterwards Attorney General of Trinidad and Tobago, 1911)
1900–1904 Sir Samuel Brownlow Gray
1878–1899 Sir Josiah Rees 
1872–1877 Thomas Lett Wood 
1856–1871 John Harvey Darrell 
1834–1856 Thomas Butterfield 
1810–1834 James Christie Esten 
1785–1809 Daniel Leonard
1783–1785 John Harvey
1781–1782 William Brimage
1766–1781 Jonathan Burch 
1755–1765 Nathaniel Butterfield
1750–1755 George Forbes
1748–1749 John Tucker
1744–1748 Nathaniel Bascombe 
1735–1743 John Darrell
1727–1735 William Outerbridge
1709–1727 Samuel Sherlock
1706–1708 Anthony White 
 ?–1706 Richard Stafford
 c.1705 Samuel Spofforth
 c.1695 Gilbert Nelson
 1687–? Thomas Richardson
 William Penistone
 Leonard White

References

Chief justices